Bainbridge Island is a city and island in Kitsap County, Washington. It is located in Puget Sound. The population was 23,025 at the 2010 census and an estimated 25,298 in 2019, making Bainbridge Island the second largest city in Kitsap County.

The island is separated from the Kitsap Peninsula by Port Orchard, with Bremerton lying to the southwest. Bainbridge Island is a suburb of Seattle, connected via the Washington State Ferries system and to Poulsbo and the Suquamish Indian Reservation by State Route 305, which uses the Agate Pass Bridge.

History
For thousands of years, members of the Suquamish people and their ancestors lived on the land now called Bainbridge Island. There were nine villages on the island; these included winter villages at Port Madison, Battle Point, Point White, Lynwood Center, Port Blakely, and Eagle Harbor, as well as summer villages at Manzanita, Fletcher Bay, and Rolling Bay.

In 1792, English explorer Captain George Vancouver spent several days with his ship HMS Discovery anchored off Restoration Point at the southern end of Bainbridge Island while boat parties surveyed other parts of Puget Sound. Vancouver spent a day exploring Rich Passage, Port Orchard, and Sinclair Inlet. He failed to find Agate Passage, and so his maps show Bainbridge Island as a peninsula. Vancouver named Restoration Point on May 29, the anniversary of the English Restoration, in honor of King Charles II.

In 1841, US Navy Lieutenant Charles Wilkes visited the island while surveying the Pacific Northwest. Lt. Wilkes named the island after Commodore William Bainbridge, commander of the frigate USS Constitution in the War of 1812. Settlers originally used Bainbridge Island as a center for the logging and shipbuilding industries. The island was known for huge and accessible cedars, which were especially in demand for ships' masts. The original county seat of Kitsap County was at Port Madison on the island's north end.

In 1855, the Suquamish tribe relinquished their claim to Bainbridge Island by signing the Point Elliott Treaty. The Suquamish agreed to cede all of their territory (which included Bainbridge Island) to the United States in exchange for a reservation at Port Madison and fishing rights to Puget Sound.

The first generation of Japanese immigrants, the Issei, came in 1883. During World War II, Japanese-American residents of Bainbridge Island were the first to be sent to internment camps, an event commemorated by the Bainbridge Island Japanese American Exclusion Memorial, which opened in 2011. They were held by the US government through the duration of the war for fear of espionage. A High-frequency direction finding (HFDF) station was established here by the Navy during the war. These radio intercept sites along the West Coast were used to track Japanese warships and merchant marine vessels as far away as the Western Pacific. The other West Coast stations were in California at Point Arguello, Point Saint George, Farallon Islands and San Diego.

Since the 1960s, Bainbridge Island has become an increasingly affluent bedroom community of Seattle, a 35-minute ride away on the Washington State Ferries.

The city has occupied the entire space of Bainbridge Island since February 28, 1991, when the  city of Winslow (incorporated on August 9, 1947), annexed the rest of the island after a narrowly passed November 1990 referendum. It officially remained the city of Winslow for several months, until November 7, 1991 at which time the city of Winslow was renamed the city of Bainbridge Island.

Geography

Bainbridge Island was formed during the last ice age—13,000 to 15,000 years ago—when the  Vashon Glacier scraped out the Puget Sound and Hood Canal basins.

Bainbridge Island is located within the Puget Sound Basin, east of the Kitsap Peninsula, directly east of the Manette Peninsula and west of the city of Seattle.

Bainbridge Island shorelines border the main body of Puget Sound, as well as Port Orchard Bay, a large protected embayment, and two high-current tidal passages, Rich Passage and Agate Pass. The high point is  Toe Jam Hill.

On the Kitsap Peninsula, Bremerton and Poulsbo lie across the Port Orchard channel to the west, and the city of Port Orchard lies across Rich Passage to the south.

The island is quite hilly and hosts the Chilly Hilly bicycle ride every February.Bainbridge Island can be accessed by motor vehicle, bicycle, or foot through two access points, both on Washington State Route 305. Bainbridge Island is connected to the Kitsap Peninsula by the Agate Pass Bridge, carrying SR 305 over Agate Passage at the island's northwest corner. The only other way off the island is by the Seattle–Bainbridge Island ferry, the Washington State Ferries service from the dock at Winslow in Eagle Harbor to Colman Dock (Pier 52) in Seattle. Numerous public right of way access points to water around the island also exist, officially referred to as Road Ends.

Communities 
When the city of Winslow annexed the entirety of Bainbridge Island in 1991, it absorbed numerous named unincorporated communities. Most of these locations are still referred to by name on the island, and maintain their own local character within the city.

Demographics

According to a 2007 estimate, the median income for a household in the city was $88,243, and the median income for a family was $108,605. Males had a median income of $65,853 versus $42,051 for females. The per capita income for the city was $37,482. About 3.0% of families and 4.4% of the population were below the poverty line, including 3.8% of those under age 18 and 3.3% of those age 65 or over.

The socioeconomic profile varies significantly between the rural parts of the island and Winslow, its urban center. In contrast to Bainbridge Island as a whole, Winslow is home to households with a wide range of incomes. In 2010, the census block group in which Winslow is located had a median household income of $42,000, less than half of the island's median household income and one-third of several of the island's wealthiest block groups, and also $10,000 less than national and statewide averages. More than half of Winslow households live in rental units, compared to 20% of households across the island.

2010 census
As of the census of 2010, there were 23,025 people, 9,470 households, and 6,611 families residing in the city. The racial makeup of the city was 91.0% White, 0.4% African American, 0.5% Native American, 3.2% Asian, 0.2% Pacific Islander, 0.7% from other races, and 3.9% from two or more races. Hispanic or Latino of any race were 3.9% of the population.

There were 9,470 households, of which 31.9% had children under the age of 18 living with them, 60.2% were married couples living together, 7.1% had a female householder with no husband present, 2.6% had a male householder with no wife present, and 30.2% were non-families. 25.1% of all households were made up of individuals, and 10.6% had someone living alone who was 65 years of age or older. The average household size was 2.41 and the average family size was 2.88.

The median age in the city was 47.7 years. 23.7% of residents were under the age of 18; 4.1% were between the ages of 18 and 24; 17.5% were from 25 to 44; 38% were from 45 to 64; and 16.4% were 65 years of age or older. The gender makeup of the city was 48.3% male and 51.7% female.

2000 census

As of the census of 2000, there were 20,308 people, 7,979 households, and 5,784 families residing in the city. The population density was 735.6 inhabitants per square mile (284.0/km2). There were 8,517 housing units at an average density of 308.5 per square mile (119.1/km2). The racial makeup of the city was 92.88% White, 0.28% African American, 0.62% Native American, 2.40% Asian, 0.11% Pacific Islander, 0.75% from other races, and 2.96% from two or more races. Hispanics or Latinos, of any race, were 2.17% of the population.

There were 7,979 households, out of which 36.8% had children under the age of 18 living with them, 63.1% were married couples living together, 7.1% had a female householder with no husband present, and 27.5% were non-families. 22.6% of all households were made up of individuals, and 9.1% had someone living alone who was 65 years of age or older. The average household size was 2.52 and the average family size was 2.98.

In the city, the population was spread out, with 26.7% under the age of 18, 3.6% from 18 to 24, 23.8% from 25 to 44, 33.1% from 45 to 64, and 12.8% who were 65 years of age or older. The median age was 43 years. For every 100 females, there were 94.5 males. For every 100 females age 18 and over, there were 90.0 males.

Economy
Bainbridge Island has four centers of commerce: Winslow, Lynwood Center, Fletcher Bay (also referred to as Island Center), and Rolling Bay. Winslow is the downtown core and has most of the shopping and dining. Lynwood Center on the south end of the island has several restaurants and a small hotel. Fletcher Bay (also referred to as Island Center) has a small grocery store and one restaurant. Rolling Bay is located on the east side of the island.

The local newspapers are the weekly Bainbridge Island Review, Kitsap Sun, and the Bainbridge Islander.

The Buy Nothing Project was founded on Bainbridge Island in July 2013.

Education

Public schools
Bainbridge Island is served by the Bainbridge Island School District, which houses the following public schools:

 Capt. Johnston Blakely Elementary School (K-4)
 Capt. Charles Wilkes Elementary School (PK-4)
 Ordway Elementary School (K-4) (offers the El Velero Spanish immersion program)
 Sonoji Sakai Intermediate School (5-6)
 Woodward Middle School (7-8)
 Bainbridge High School (9-12)

BISD also offers home-based and student-directed educational programming under the umbrella of the Commodore Options School:

 Mosaic Home Education Partnership (K-8)
 Odyssey Multiage Program (K-8)
 Eagle Harbor High School (9-12)

Private schools
 Montessori Country School (PK-6)
 Madrona School (Unknown, this school currently is not fully functional)
 St. Cecilia Catholic School (PK-8)
 The Island School (K-5)
 Carden Country School (K-8)
 Hyla School (6-12)

The Puget Sound Naval Academy, formerly the Moran School, operated on the island from 1914 to 1933, and then again from 1937 to 1951.

Sports and recreation
Landowners have been concerned with keeping a tight control over development, both residential and commercial. The Bainbridge Island Land Trust, city and park district maintain "island open space."

In 2001, Bainbridge Island Little League were represented in South Williamsport, Pennsylvania at the Little League World Series. The island's high school lacrosse team has won state titles, the most recent coming on May 19, 2007. In 2009, the Bainbridge High School Fastpitch team won the Washington 3A State Title. The team also played in the championship game in 2010.  In 2011, 2012 and 2018, the Bainbridge High School Girls Lacrosse team won the state championship.

Pickleball was invented by the family of congressman Joel Pritchard at their summer home on Bainbridge Island in 1965. It is similar to badminton and tennis, but played with paddles and a lightweight plastic ball.

Government and politics
Bainbridge Island has a seven-member city council. The members are elected to staggered four-year terms and appoint a city manager.

Bainbridge Island is a stronghold of the Democratic Party. Jay Inslee, the 23rd governor of Washington, is a local resident, and represented it in Congress from 1999 to 2012.

In the U.S. Congress Bainbridge is part of Washington's 6th congressional district and is represented by Democrat Derek Kilmer.

In the 2004 Presidential election, Democrat John Kerry received 72.87% of the vote to Republican George W. Bush's 25.58%. In 2008, Barack Obama defeated John McCain by a margin of 77.79% to 20.79%.

In the 2009 election, Bainbridge Island passed Referendum 71, the "Everything but Marriage" gay rights bill, with 79.40% of the vote. It received 53.15% statewide. Bainbridge Island was one of the few municipalities in the state where the measure outperformed Obama.

In the 2008 Democratic primary (which in Washington state was not used for delegate appointment), Barack Obama defeated Hillary Clinton by a margin of 67.8% to 29.7%. This was Obama's second-best performance in an incorporated municipality in the state, behind Yarrow Point. In the earlier caucus, Obama received 79.3% of delegates, Clinton received 19.8%, and 0.1% were uncommitted.

Arts and culture

The Bainbridge Island Museum of Art opened in June 2013 near the Winslow ferry terminal. It was developed by Cynthia Sears, who began collecting works of art made by island residents in 1989. The museum cost $15.6 million to construct and includes a 99-seat auditorium, a classroom, and other spaces. The building has  of space and was designed to resemble the bow of a ship.

The restaurant Seabird was named one of the "Best New Restaurants in America" in 2022, a list curated by Esquire. The establishment focuses on seafood and vegetarian dishes, using staples and ingredients from local sources.

In popular culture
The fictional San Piedro Island in the 1994 novel Snow Falling on Cedars is based on Bainbridge Island. The novel's author, David Guterson, lives on the island and worked for ten years as a teacher at Bainbridge High School.

Bainbridge Island is the main setting of the 2021 novel You Love Me, the third installment in the You series by novelist Caroline Kepnes. Kepnes visited Bainbridge while writing the story and used the names of several local businesses.

In Michael Crichton's 1994 novel Disclosure, protagonist Tom Sanders lives with his wife and two children on Bainbridge Island. Some scenes from the film adaptation later that year were filmed on the island, including at Bainbridge Ferry Terminal and Capt. Johnston Blakely Elementary School.

The epilogue of the 1996 film That Thing You Do! reveals that main characters Guy Patterson and Faye Dolan moved with their four children to Bainbridge Island, where they founded the fictional Puget Sound Conservatory of Music.

Bainbridge Island is featured in the first episode of the fifteenth season of the HGTV reality television series Island Life. A local restaurant, the Big Star Diner (now known as the Madison Diner), is featured in the tenth episode of the first season of the Food Network series Diners, Drive-Ins and Dives.

Photo gallery

Notable people

 Laura Allen, actress
 Bruce Barcott, author
 Jane F. Barry, author, Linksbridge principal
 Tori Black, adult film star, Penthouse cover model
 Marshall Latham Bond, landlord, employer of Jack London for part of Klondike Gold Rush
 John Henry Browne, defense attorney
 Frank Buxton, actor, television writer, author and television director
 Paul Brainerd, founder of Islandwood
 Dove Cameron, actress and singer
 Chad Channing, musician, former drummer with Nirvana
 Leeann Chin, founder of the Leeann Chin restaurant chain
 Al Conti, Grammy Nominated Composer
 Mark Crispin, inventor
Ben Eisenhardt (born 1990), American-Israeli professional basketball player in the Israeli Basketball Premier League
 Jonathan Evison, author
 Stefan Frei, professional soccer player
 Bill Frisell, musician
 Meg Greenfield, editor, The Washington Post editorial page
 David Guterson, author
 Kristin Hannah, author
 Brendan Hill, musician, drummer with Blues Traveler
 Jay Inslee, governor of Washington
 Russell Johnson, actor, best known as "The Professor" on Gilligan's Island
 Chris Kattan, comedian, actor
 David Korten, economist, author and political activist
 Damien Lawson, musician, singer with Awaken the Empire
 Garrett Madison, mountain climber 
 Dinah Manoff, actress 
 Jon Brower Minnoch, heaviest man recorded in history
 Elizabeth Mitchell, actress
 Jack Olsen, author
 John Perkins, author
 Dav Pilkey, author, illustrator
 Gifford Pinchot III, author, entrepreneur
 Jack Prelutsky, poet
 Dorothy Provine, actress
 Kiel Reijnen, professional cyclist, 
 Ben Shepherd, bassist with Soundgarden
 Emily Silver, Olympic swimmer (silver medalist)
 Allen Strange, professor of music and director of the electronic music studios San Jose State University
 Michael Trimble, operatic tenor, voice teacher
 Ed Viesturs, mountain climber
 Marcel Vigneron, runner-up of Top Chef, executive chef in Marcel's Quantum Kitchen
 Susan Wiggs, author
 Garin Wolf, television writer, playwright
 Andrew Wood, musician

Sister cities
Bainbridge has the following sister cities:

  Ometepe Island, Nicaragua
  Nantes, France

See also

 List of islands of Washington (state)
 Lynwood Theatre

References

External links

 City website
Map of Bainbridge Island

 
1841 establishments in Oregon
Cities in Kitsap County, Washington
Cities in Washington (state)
Islands of Puget Sound
Landforms of Kitsap County, Washington
Logging communities in the United States
Pickleball
Populated places established in 1841
Populated places on Puget Sound